was a Japanese political party that existed from December 1997 to January 1998. It was formed by former Prime Minister Morihiro Hosokawa and four other legislators (Yoriko Madoka, Shinji Tarutoko, Kiyoshi Ueda and Takenori Emoto) who left the New Frontier Party in June 1997. From Five merged into the Good Governance Party in January 1998, which became part of the Democratic Party of Japan in 1998.

Presidents of FF

References

Defunct political parties in Japan
Political parties established in 1997
Political parties disestablished in 1998
1997 establishments in Japan
1998 disestablishments in Japan